The Cassimus House is a historic Queen Anne style house at 110 North Jackson Street in Montgomery, Alabama.  The two-story frame house was completed in 1893.  It is the last residential structure remaining in its city block.  It was added to the National Register of Historic Places on August 13, 1976.

References

Houses on the National Register of Historic Places in Alabama
National Register of Historic Places in Montgomery, Alabama
Queen Anne architecture in Alabama
Houses completed in 1893
Houses in Montgomery, Alabama